Elections were held in the organized municipalities in the Nipissing District of Ontario on October 27, 2014 in conjunction with municipal elections across the province.

Bonfield

Calvin

Chisholm

East Ferris

Mattawa

Mattawan

North Bay

Papineau-Cameron

South Algonquin

Temagami

West Nipissing

References
Results 

Nipissing
Nipissing District